New Testament manuscripts in Greek are categorized into five groups, according to a scheme introduced in 1981 by Kurt and Barbara Aland in The Text of the New Testament. The categories are based on how each manuscript relates to the various text-types. Generally speaking, earlier Alexandrian manuscripts are category I, while later Byzantine manuscripts are category V. Aland's method involved considering 1000 passages where the Byzantine text differs from non-Byzantine text. The Alands did not select their 1000 readings from all of the NT books; for example, none were drawn from Matthew and Luke.

Description of categories 
The Alands' categories do not simply correspond to the text-types; all they do is demonstrate the 'Byzantine-ness' of a particular text; that is, how much it is similar to the Byzantine text-type, from least (Category I) to most similar (Category V). Category V can be equated with the Byzantine text-type, but the other categories are not necessarily representative of a text-type. Even though most texts in Category I agree with the Alexandrian text-type, they are not necessarily Alexandrian themselves; they are just very non-Byzantine.

The Alands introduced the following categories (Aland & Aland category description according to the 1989 English translation, p. 106, between quotation marks):
Category I: "Manuscripts of a very special quality which should always be considered in establishing the original text." This category includes almost all manuscripts before the 4th century. Some 4th-century and earlier papyri and uncials are in this category, as are manuscripts of the Alexandrian text-type. The Alands say the manuscripts in this category are important when considering textual problems, and in their opinion "presumably [represent] the original text".

Category II: "Manuscripts of a special quality, but distinguished from manuscripts of Category I by the presence of alien influences." The manuscripts in this category are similar to category I manuscripts, and are important in textual consideration of the autograph. However, the texts usually contain some alien influences, such as those found in the Byzantine text-type. Egyptian texts fall in this category.

Category III: "Manuscripts of a distinctive character with an independent text... particularly important for the history of the text." The manuscripts in category III are important when discussing the history of the textual traditions and to a lesser degree for establishing the original text. The manuscripts usually contain independent readings, and have a distinctive character. ƒ and ƒ are examples of manuscript families that fall within this category. Manuscripts of this category usually present mixed or eclectic text-type.

Category IV: "Manuscripts of the D text." Category IV contains the few manuscripts that follow the text of the Codex Bezae (D). These texts are of the Western text-type.

Category V: "Manuscripts with a purely or predominantly Byzantine text." This category may be equated with the Byzantine text-type. Byzantine and mostly Byzantine texts fall under this category.

Uncategorised: Some manuscripts studied by the Alands were not categorised, for example because they were too short to determine which group they belonged to, or fell somewhere in between. The unclassified manuscript could be representative of the Western text-type, the "Caesarean text-type" (a term proposed by certain scholars to denote a consistent pattern of variant readings of the four Gospels), or anything else.

Distribution of Greek manuscripts by century and category 
See ref:

Number of manuscripts by century and category

Limitations 
This system of classification would seem to prefer manuscripts which coincide more or less with the critical text of the Nestle-Aland and UBS Greek New Testaments, of which there are many supposedly Alexandrian manuscripts in Category I. Some manuscripts are placed in Category V because they are considered too "brief" to classify. The Alands consider Uncial 055 unclassifiable because it is a commentary, and not exactly an "Uncial" manuscript. Uncial 0144 and 0196 are not accessible. The Alands do not classify , stating this is due to the Diatessaric character of text (i.e. the four Gospels combined into a single narrative).

 was classified to Category I, but it is not a representative of the Alexandrian text-type. According to biblical scholar Philip Comfort it is "a good example of what Kurt and Barbara Aland call "normal" (i.e. a relatively accurate text manifesting a normal amount of error and idiosyncrasy).

Waltz stated:

See also 
 List of New Testament papyri
 List of New Testament uncials
 List of New Testament minuscules
 List of New Testament lectionaries
 Textual variants in the New Testament

Notes

References
David Ewert. From Ancient Tablets to Modern Translations: A General Introduction to the Bible. Grand Rapids, Michigan: The Zondervan Corporation, 1983.

External links 
 Manuscript Categories

 
Bible versions and translations
Greek New Testament manuscripts